Brandon Lee Figueroa (born December 29, 1996) is an American professional boxer who held the WBC super bantamweight title between May 2021 to November 2021 and the WBA (Regular) super bantamweight title from 2019 to November 2021.

As of June 2022, he was the #2 ranked super bantamweight according to BoxRec, #3 according to the TBRB and The Ring.

Personal life
Brandon who is of Mexican descent, is the younger brother of former WBC Lightweight champion Omar Figueroa.

On October 2, 2022, Figueroa was arrested for driving under the influence, after his BAC test came back at 0.15%, significantly over the permitted state limit of 0.08%.

Professional career

Super bantamweight

WBA Interim champion
Figueroa made his professional debut against Hector Gutierrez on May 9, 2015. He won the fight by unanimous decision. He amassed an 18-0 record over the next four years, with 13 stoppage victories. Figueroa was scheduled to face Yonfrez Parejo for the vacant WBA interim super bantamweight title on April 20, 2019, at the Dignity Health Sports Park in Carson, California. He was seen as a massive favorite heading into the bout, and was accordingly set as a -2879 betting favorite, while Parejo entered as a +1379 betting underdog. Figueroa won the fight by an eight-round stoppage. Although the first four rounds were even, Fighureoa began to take over from the fifth round onward, forcing Parejo to retire from the fight after the eight round.

Figueroa was scheduled to face Yonfrez Parejo, in his first WBA Interim Super Bantamweight title defense, on April 20, 2019, at the Bert Ogden Arena in Edinburg, Texas. The bout was scheduled for the undercard of the Danny García vs. Adrián Granados welterweight clash. Figueroa won the fight by a fourth-round knockout, dropping Chacon with a combination of hooks at the 2 minuted mark of the round. At the time of the stoppage, Figueroa held a 96 to 18 advantage in punches landed.

WBA Regular champion
Figueroa was scheduled to defend his WBA Regular super bantamweight title against Julio Ceja on the undercard of the Deontay Wilder vs. Luis Ortiz II fight. The bout was scheduled for November 23, 2019, at the MGM Grand Garden Arena in Paradise, Nevada. Ceja came in 4.5 lbs over the 122 lbs weight limit, meaning the title was only be on the line for Figueroa. The fight was ruled a split decision draw after twelve rounds, with one judge scoring it 116-112 for Ceja, the second 115-113 for Figueroa, while the third judge scored the fight as a 114-114 draw.

Figueroa was scheduled to make his second WBA title defense against Damien Vazquez on the undercard of The Charlos vs. Derevyanchenko and Rosario. The card was scheduled for September 26, 2020 at the Mohegan Sun Arena in Montville, Connecticut. Figueroa was seen as a massive favorite heading into the bout, with one media outlet describing it as "...a tune up fight for Figueroa". Figueroa won the fight by a tenth-round technical knockout.

Figueroa vs. Nery
Figueroa was scheduled to make the second defense of his WBA (Regular) title in a title unification bout against the reigning WBC super bantamweight champion Luis Nery. Following a four-month negotiation period, the fight was scheduled for May 15, 2021 at the Dignity Health Sports Park in Carson, California, United States. Nery was seen as a favorite to beat Figueroa, with opening odds seeing Nery as a -400 favorite and Figueroa at +275, although the line later saw Nery drop to -225 and Figueroa rise to +175. Figueroa won the fight by technical-knockout, dropping Nery with a series of body punches in the latter part of the seventh round. As Nery was unable to rise to his feet during referee Thomas Taylor's ten count, the fight was officially called at the 2:18 minute mark. The three official judges were split on their scorecards at the time of the stoppage: one had the Figueroa up 58-56, the second judge had Nery up 59-55, while the third judge saw the fight as a 57-57 draw.

Figueroa vs. Fulton
Figueroa faced the reigning WBO super bantamweight titleholder Stephen Fulton in a title unification bout. The fight was scheduled for September 11, 2021, before being postponed a week in order to replace the Canelo Alvarez and Caleb Plant fight as the main event of the September 18 PBC card. The fight was postponed for a second time on September 8, as Figueroa tested positive for COVID-19. The bout was rescheduled for November 27, 2021. Figueroa entered the bout as a +265 underdog. Figueroa lost a somewhat controversial majority 12 round decision, with votes of 114-114 and two 112-116 against him.

Featherweight

Figueroa vs. Castro
Figueroa was booked to face the fifth ranked WBC featherweight contender Carlos Castro in a featherweight title eliminator on July 9, 2022, at the Alamodome in San Antonio, Texas. The fight was scheduled as the co-feature to the WBC featherweight title clash between the champion Mark Magsayo and title challenger Rey Vargas. Figueroa justified his role as the -650 betting favorite, as he won the fight by a sixth-round technical knockout, stopping Castro with a flurry of punches at the 2:11 minute mark. He was up on the scorecards at the time of the stoppage, with two judges having scored the fight 49–45 and 48–46 in his favor, while the third judge had the fight 48–46 for Castro. Figueroa knocked Castro down once prior the stoppage, with a left in the third round.

Figueroa vs. Magsayo
An interim WBC featherweight title bout between Figueroa and Stephen Fulton was approved by the sanctioning body on November 9, 2022, as the current featherweight titlist Rey Vargas was given a one-fight exemption to move up in weight and contest the vacant super featherweight belt. The fight was a rematch of their November 27, 2021, bout, which Fulton won by majority decision. The fight was expected to take place on February 25, 2023, at the Minneapolis Armory in Central, Minneapolis. On January 16, 2023, it was revealed that Figueroa was instead finalizing a deal with the former WBC featherweight champion Mark Magsayo, as Fulton had entered into negotiations with the former three-division world champion Naoya Inoue. Figueroa faced Magsayo on March 4, 2023, at the Toyota Arena in Ontario, California. He won the fight by unanimous decision. Judges Gary Ritter and Fernando Villarreal scored the bout 117–110 in his favor, while judge Zachary Young awarded him a wider 118–110 scorecard. Magsayo was deducted a point apiece in rounds eight and eleven for excessive holding.

Professional boxing record

See also
List of world super-bantamweight boxing champions
List of Mexican boxing world champions

References

External links

Brandon Figueroa - Profile, News Archive & Current Rankings at Box.Live

1996 births
Living people
American male boxers
American boxers of Mexican descent
Boxers from Texas
People from Weslaco, Texas
World super-bantamweight boxing champions
World Boxing Association champions
World Boxing Council champions